Xenotriccus is a genus of bird in the family Tyrannidae.

Species
It contains the following species:

References

 
Bird genera
 
Taxa named by Jonathan Dwight
Taxonomy articles created by Polbot